Pulaparthi Ramanjaneyulu (Anji Babu) is an Indian politician, belonging to the Telugu Desam Party. Ramanjaneyulu is a Member of the Andhra Pradesh Legislative Assembly, representing the Bhimavaram constituency. He was in Indian National Congress until 2014 when he worked as MLA from 2009 to 2014.

References

Telugu Desam Party politicians
Andhra Pradesh MLAs 2009–2014
Andhra Pradesh MLAs 2014–2019
Living people
People from West Godavari district
Year of birth missing (living people)
Indian National Congress politicians from Andhra Pradesh